Ì is used in the ISO 9:1995 system of Ukrainian transliteration as the Cyrillic letter І.

In the Pinyin system of Chinese romanization ì is an i with a falling tone.

This appears in Alcozauca Mixtec, Italian, Sardinian, Taos, Vietnamese, Welsh, Alsatian, Scottish Gaelic, Ojibwe, and also in the constructed language Na'vi.

See also
Grave accent

Latin letters with diacritics